The 2022 GB3 Championship was a motor racing championship for open wheel, formula racing cars held across England and Belgium. The 2022 season was the seventh organised by the British Racing Drivers' Club in the United Kingdom, and the second season under the GB3 moniker after rebranding from the BRDC British Formula 3 Championship in mid-2021. The championship featured a mix of professional motor racing teams and privately funded drivers. For the 2022 season, a new updated chassis and engine pack were introduced. The season was run over eight triple-header rounds.

Luke Browning took the drivers' championship at the final round at Donington Park, with his team, Hitech Grand Prix, taking their first teams' title.

Teams and drivers 
All teams were British-registered.

Race calendar 
The provisional calendar was announced on 22 October 2021. The championship supported the British GT championship at seven of its eight meetings.

Season report

First half 
The 2022 GB3 Championship began over the traditional Easter Weekend at Oulton Park with a double pole for Luke Browning. He was unchallenged in the first race and won ahead of Roberto Faria and Matthew Rees, who also retained their starting spots. Incidents behind them ended Javier Sagrera's race. The second race offered much the same picture, with Browning converting his second pole into another comfortable victory. Faria meanwhile had to overtake Joel Granfors at the start to get another second place, with Granfors then coming third. The reverse-grid race three saw Mikkel Grundtvig start from pole, resisting attacks from Tommy Smith behind him to win the race. David Morales completed the podium. Browning retired after contact, but his two wins still meant he led the championship after round one, ten points ahead of Faria.

Next up was the first visit to Silverstone Circuit, and this time it was two poles for Granfors. Browning took second from Tom Lebbon at the start of race one and started to go after Granfors, but the latter was able to keep ahead and score his maiden GB3 win. In race two, roles were reversed, as this time Lebbon was the one making the move at the start, passing Granfors for the race lead into Maggotts. Browning came third this time around. Morales was the polesitter for race three, but dropped down to third at the start. The new leading duo of Cian Shields and Nick Gilkes battled all race, with Shields eventually coming out ahead to win. Bryce Aron also overtook Morales to complete the podium. Granfors' two podiums and eleven places gained in race three promoted him to the championship lead, three points ahead of Browning.

The third round was held at Donington Park, where Granfors and Max Esterson shared poles. The first race started with chaos, as championship leader Granfors retired from contact and his closest rival also crashed while trying to avoid the stricken Granfors. Callum Voisin inherited the lead and held it until the end to win ahead of Faria and Esterson. Race two was not much calmer, with Esterson defending from Voisin who had to take to the grass to avoid contact, dropping behind Granfors and Browning in the process. The reversed-grid race was the most straightforward: Aron converted his pole into a win, while Branden Lee Oxley converted third to second by passing Grundvig at the start. With both championship leaders first retiring, then on the podium and having a similar race three, the gap at the top closed up to a single point.

The first half of the season came to a close at Snetterton Circuit, with Voisin and Browning winning in qualifying. Voisin held the lead of race one as Granfors' poor start forced him to concede second to Browning. The latter then came close to gaining the lead several times, but could not do so. The second race began with a three-wide moment between Browning, Granfors and Rees. The latter had to back out and lost third to Sagrera. The top two battled all race, but Browning held on to win the race. Grundtvig was once again on reverse grid pole, next to Shields, who had an overheating issue that saw him drop back and retire. Zak Taylor took second, but also soon made a mistake fighting and dropped down. This promoted Marcos Flack and James Hedley to the podium. Browning beat Granfors in all three races and took the championship lead.

Second half 
The only continental round of the season at Spa-Francorchamps came next, and Browning took both pole positions. He lost the lead to Granfors down the Kemmel straight, but a safety car for a three-car crash was called straight away. Browning retook the lead at the restart and never looked back, with Granfors in second. Shields came third, before a penalty gave that podium to Oxley. Race two saw Browning drop again, this time to third behind Oxley and Granfors. The latter then went for the lead, forcing Oxley out into the gravel, before Browning repeated his move for the win once again. Race three was disrupted by a red flag following a hefty crash by Morales. Only three racing laps were completed. Half points were awarded for the race won by Voisin ahead of Smith and Faria. Browning's two wins extended his championship gap to 25.5 points.

The second Silverstone event began with Browning getting excluded from qualifying for a technical infringement. Voisin started race one from pole, before losing out to Granfors and Sagrera. He re-passed Sagrera later, but it was too late to close up to Granfors, as Faria then got by Sagrera for third. Race two saw Voisin drop from pole to fourth, behind Lebbon, Granfors and Sagrera. Voisin spent the rest of the race trying to make up for his start, climbing up to second place. Lebbon was later disqualified, but this decision was overturned in the end. Debutant Ayrton Ori started race three from pole, but could not hold on to the lead. A tumultuous race saw multiple drivers rise up the grid, with Flack winning in the end. Brownings exclusion meant he could not fight at the front, while Granfors' three podiums saw him take the championship lead.

Brands Hatch hosted the penultimate round of the year, and Rees and Lebbon shared honors in qualifying. Rees led the first race from start to finish, while behind him Granfors slipped back to fourth, behind Browning and John Bennett. He later repassed Bennett, but was not able to match Browning. Race two saw Lebbon defend from Rees at the start. Slight contact between the two saw Rees drop behind Browning, who had overtaken Granfors for third earlier on. Race three saw a red flag when Voisin and Esterson hit the barriers. Oxley restarted from pole as Flack was sent to the back for a jump start, and won ahead of Shields and Faria. The championship lead changed hands once again after the round, with Browning once again beating his rival in all three races and coming out 15.5 points ahead.

The season finale was held at Donington Park. Voisin picked up two poles in qualifying and led the first race from start to finish. Behind him, Browning started fifth and was able to climb to third, before Lebbon in second got a penalty that promoted Browning and Bennett up a place. Race two started on a slightly damp track, with the field split on tire choice. Voisin had a bad start and dropped to third, letting Granfors into the lead, before the latter got dispatched by Lebbon. When the track got drier, Granfors lost pace and dropped down the field. Aron was the big winner, running on dry tires and climbing up to third place at the end, behind Browning, whose second place earned him the championship title. Race three saw Gilkes take his maiden victory in a lights-to-flag run ahead of Shields and Connor, while Hitech passed Carlin to win the teams' title.

Championship standings 

 Scoring system

Points were awarded to the top 20 classified finishers in races one and two, with the third race awarding points to only the top 15. Race three, which had its grid formed by reversing the qualifying order, awarded extra points for positions gained from the drivers' respective starting positions.

 Notes

 1 2 3 refers to positions gained and thus extra points earned during race three.

Drivers' championship

Teams' championship 
Each team counted its two best results of every race.

Notes

External links

References 

BRDC British Formula 3 Championship seasons
GB3
GB3